Ioana Voicu (born 27 February 1972) is a Romanian diver. She competed in the women's 10 metre platform event at the 1992 Summer Olympics.

References

1972 births
Living people
Romanian female divers
Olympic divers of Romania
Divers at the 1992 Summer Olympics
Place of birth missing (living people)